Rory Desmond McCann (born 11 January 1985) is an Irish cricketer. McCann is a right-handed batsman who fields as a wicket-keeper. He was born at Belfast in Northern Ireland.

McCann made his debut for Ireland in two List A matches against West Indies A in 2010 at the Stormont. With the unavailability of regular wicket-keeper Niall O'Brien, McCann was selected for Ireland's squad for the 2010 World Cricket League Division One. McCann made his One Day International debut during the tournament, against Kenya. He made six One Day International appearances during the tournament. McCann had an uneventful tournament, which was eventually won by Ireland, scoring 24 runs at an average of 8.00, while behind the stumps he took 8 catches.

During Ireland's tour to Canada in September 2010, McCann made his first-class debut against Canada in the Intercontinental Cup. Opening the batting in this match, he was dismissed for 4 runs in Ireland's first-innings by Khurram Chohan, while in their second-innings he was dismissed for a duck by Henry Osinde. Though a poor match for McCann with the bat, he did stand out behind the stumps, taking five catches in the Canadians first-innings and four in their second. He later played in both of Ireland's One Day Internationals that followed the first-class match. Having not featured for Ireland since their tour to Canada, McCann was selected for Ireland's tour to Kenya in February 2012 and as part of their squad for the 2012 World Twenty20 Qualifier, due in part to Niall O'Brien's participation in the Bangladesh Premier League.

During the tour of Kenya, McCann didn't feature in the first-class Intercontinental Cup match, or the One Day International series that followed it, he did however make his Twenty20 International debut in the three match Twenty20 series which followed, although he wasn't required to bat in the first two matches.

References

External links
Rory McCann at ESPNcricinfo
Rory McCann at CricketArchive

1985 births
Living people
Cricketers from Belfast
Irish cricketers
Ireland One Day International cricketers
Ireland Twenty20 International cricketers
Cricketers from Northern Ireland
Wicket-keepers